Willie McLean may refer to:

 Willie McLean (soccer, born 1904) (1904–1977), Scottish-born American international soccer player
 Willie McLean (footballer, born 1935) (born 1935), Scottish football player and manager
 Willie McLean (rugby league) (born 1973), New Zealand rugby league player

See also
 William McLean (disambiguation)